The following elections occurred in the year 1989.

Africa
 1989 Beninese parliamentary election
 1989 Botswana general election
 1989 Equatorial Guinean presidential election
 1989 People's Republic of the Congo parliamentary election
 1989 Guinea-Bissau legislative election
 1989 Malagasy parliamentary election
 1989 Malagasy presidential election
 1989 Namibian parliamentary election
 1989 Nigerien general election
 1989 Seychellois presidential election
 1989 South African general election
 1989 Gazankulu legislative election 
 1989 Tunisian general election
 1989 Ugandan general election

Asia
 1989 Iranian presidential election
 1989 Iranian constitutional referendum
 1989 Iraqi parliamentary election
 1989 Japanese House of Councillors election
 1989 Philippine barangay election
 1989 Soviet Union legislative election
 1989 Sri Lankan parliamentary election
 1989 Taiwanese legislative election
 Turkey: 
 1989 Turkish local elections
 1989 Turkish presidential election

India
 1989 Indian general election
 Indian general election in Andhra Pradesh, 1989
 Indian general election in Tamil Nadu, 1989
 1989 Tamil Nadu legislative assembly election

Europe
 1989 Belgian regional elections
 Dutch general election
 Greek legislative election 
 November 1989 Greek legislative election
 1989 Irish general election
 1989 Luxembourgian legislative election
 1989 Norwegian parliamentary election
 1989 Polish legislative election
 1989 Soviet Union legislative election
 1989 Spanish general election

European Parliament
 European Parliament election, June 1989
 1989 European Parliament election in Belgium
 1989 European Parliament election in Denmark
 1989 European Parliament election in Portugal
 1989 European Parliament election in Sardinia
 1989 European Parliament election in the United Kingdom
 1989 European Parliament election in France
 1989 European Parliament election in Greece
 1989 European Parliament election in Ireland
 1989 European Parliament election in Italy
 1989 European Parliament election in Luxembourg
 1989 European Parliament election in the Netherlands
 1989 European Parliament election in Spain
 1989 European Parliament election in West Germany
 1989 European Parliament election in France
 1989 European Parliament election in West Germany
 1989 European Parliament election in Italy
 1989 European Parliament election in Spain

France
 1989 French municipal elections

Italy
 1989 European Parliament election in Sardinia

Americas

North America
 1989–1991 Belizean municipal elections
 1989 Belizean legislative election
 1989 Honduran general election
 1989 Panamanian general election
 1989 Salvadoran presidential election

Canada
 1989 Alberta Senate nominee election
 1989 Alberta general election
 1989 Beaver River federal by-election
 1989 Edmonton municipal election
 1989 Manitoba municipal elections
 1989 New Democratic Party leadership election
 1989 Newfoundland general election
 1989 Prince Edward Island general election
 1989 Progressive Conservative Party of New Brunswick leadership election
 1989 Quebec general election
 1989 Winnipeg municipal election
 1989 Yukon general election

United States
 1989 United States gubernatorial elections

United States mayoral
 1989 Houston mayoral election
 1989 Pittsburgh mayoral election
 1989 Virginia gubernatorial election

Caribbean
 1989 Antigua and Barbuda general election
 1989 Jamaican general election

South America 
 1989 Argentine general election
 1989 Bolivian presidential election
 1989 Brazilian presidential election
 1989 Chilean political reform referendum
 1989 Chilean presidential election
 1989 Falkland Islands general election
 1989 Uruguayan general election

Oceania
 1989 Cook Islands general election

Australia
 1989 Australian Capital Territory general election
 1989 Gwydir by-election
 1989 Merthyr state by-election
 1989 Queensland state election
 1989 South Australian state election
 1989 Tasmanian state election
 1989 Western Australian state election

See also

 
1989
Elections